Rick White (born 5 December 1970) is a Canadian musician and singer-songwriter. Born in Moncton, New Brunswick, he was a member of indie bands Eric's Trip, Elevator, Perplexus, and The Unintended.  White first played music, in a band called "Bloodstain", in 1984, before starting his own band "in 1986", called "T.C.I.B", which later transitioned into the band name, "The Underdogs", which lasted from the summer of 1987, until June 1988. By the summer of 1989, The Underdogs had broken up, and Rick had joined another band, "The Forest", which lasted from the 1989, until June 1990, with a one-off recording session happening in December, 1990. Prior to Eric's Trip, and while in Eric's Trip, White also recorded two solo-produced albums, one in March 1990, and another in August 1991, but both were not released until 2022. Known for lo-fi recording, he has also recorded and produced music for The Sadies, Orange Glass, Joel Plaskett, One Hundred Dollars, Dog Day, HotKid and his former Eric's Trip bandmate Julie Doiron.

White released his first solo album, The Rick White Album, in late 2005. He followed it with Memoreaper in 2007. White's next album, 137, is a double album which was released in 2009 on Blue Fog Recordings. He released a record in 2019, The Opening, and was recorded with Eiyn Sof. His most latest album, with all original material, is Where It's Fine, which was released in 2021.

Discography

The Underdogs
The Underdogs – (Compilation & live tracks, recorded Summer 1987- Jun. 1988) - Bandcamp, April 2020

The Forest
The Forest – (Compilation, recorded Nov. 1989- Dec. 1990) - Bandcamp, Nov. 3, 2019.

Eric's Trip

Elevator

EPs
 Forward to Snow – 7-inch EP, Sappy Records, April 1995
 Backwards May – 7-inch EP, Sappy, September 1996
 Onwards and Away – 7-inch EP, Squirtgun, March 1997

Cassettes
 Elevator to Hell (demo) – cassette, September 1994
 Parts Four and Five – cassette, Astronavigation, September 1997; CDR, Great Beyond, December 2001
 Recorded Live in Halifax on 2 August 1997 – cassette, September 1997

Albums
 Elevator to Hell – LP, Sub Pop, February 1995
 Part 3 – mini-LP, Sub Pop, July 1996
 Parts 1–3 – CD, Sub Pop, August 1996
 Eerieconsiliation – CD/LP Sub Pop, August 1997
 Original Music from the Motion Picture The Such – CD, Murderecords, May 1998
 Vague Premonition – CD, Sub Pop, April 1999; LP, Sonic Unyon, June 1999
 Live in Concert 24 April 99 – LP, Great Beyond, June 1999
 A Taste of Complete Perspective – CD/LP, Teenage USA, September 2000
 Early Band Recordings: February 1995 – June 1997 – CDR, Great Beyond, December 2001
 Live in Concert 2001 – CDR, Great Beyond, December 2001
 Lost During Headquake – CDR, Great Beyond, December 2001
 4D – CDR, Great Beyond, February 2002
 Darkness → Light – CD, Blue Fog, October 2002
 The Sightseer Project – CDR, Great Beyond, February 2003
 Parts Six and Seven – CDR, Great Beyond, Spring 2004
 Live in Toronto, 24 October 2003 – CDR, Great Beyond, Spring 2004
 August – CD, Blue Fog, 2005

Solo/Rick White Album
Live at the Paramount Lounge. 13 August 2003 (Great Beyond) – 2003
The Rick White Album (Bluefog) – 2005
Memoreaper LP (Bluefog) – 2007
137 LP (Bluefog) – 2009
The Opening LP w/ Eiyn Sof (Bluefog) – 2019
Where It's Fine LP (Bluefog) – 2021
4 O'Clock In The Morning Sessions (March 1990) - (recorded March 1990) - March 4, 2022
Pop Hits 91 (Aug. 1991) - (recorded Aug. 1991) - April 1, 2022

See also

Music of Canada
Canadian rock
List of Canadian musicians

References

External links

1970 births
Living people
Canadian rock singers
Canadian rock guitarists
Canadian male guitarists
Canadian record producers
Canadian indie rock musicians
Musicians from Moncton
Sub Pop artists
21st-century Canadian guitarists
21st-century Canadian male singers